A ZIP Code is a postal code used by the United States Postal Service (USPS). Introduced on July 1, 1963, the basic format consisted of five digits. In 1983, an extended ZIP+4 code was introduced; it included the five digits of the ZIP Code, followed by a hyphen and four digits that designated a more specific location.

The term ZIP is an acronym for Zone Improvement Plan; it was chosen to suggest that the mail travels more efficiently and quickly (zipping along) when senders use the code in the postal address. The term ZIP Code was originally registered as a service mark by the USPS; its registration expired in 1997.

History

Early history and five-digit ZIP Codes

The early history and context of postal codes began with postal district/zone numbers. The United States Post Office Department (USPOD) implemented postal zones for 178 large cities in May 1943. Postmaster General Frank Walker explained that many experienced postal clerks were going into the army, and the zone system would enable inexperienced clerks to sort mail without having to learn the delivery area of each city carrier. 

For example:

Mr. John Smith
3256 Epiphenomenal Avenue
Minneapolis 16, Minnesota

The "16" is the number of the postal zone in a specific city.

By the early 1960s, a more organized system was needed, and non-mandatory five-digit ZIP Codes were introduced nationwide on July 1, 1963. The USPOD issued its Publication 59: Abbreviations for Use with ZIP Code on October 1, 1963, with the list of two-letter state abbreviations which are generally written with both letters capitalized. An earlier list, publicized in June 1963, had proposed capitalized abbreviations ranging from two to five letters. According to Publication 59, the two-letter standard was "based on a maximum 23-position line, because this has been found to be the most universally acceptable line capacity basis for major addressing systems", which would be exceeded by a long city name combined with a multi-letter state abbreviation, such as "Sacramento, Calif." along with the ZIP Code. The abbreviations have remained unchanged, with the exception of Nebraska, which was changed from NB to NE in 1969 at the request of the Canadian Post Office Department, to avoid confusion with New Brunswick.

Robert Moon is considered the father of the ZIP Code; he submitted his proposal in 1944 while working as a postal inspector. The phrase "zone improvement plan" is credited to D. Jamison Cain, a Postal Service executive. The post office credits Moon with only the first three digits of the ZIP Code, which describe the sectional center facility (SCF) or "sec center". An SCF is a central mail processing facility with those three digits. The fourth and fifth digits, which give a more precise locale within the SCF, were proposed by Henry Bentley Hahn, Sr.

The SCF sorts mail to all post offices with those first three digits in their ZIP Codes. The mail is sorted according to the final two digits of the ZIP Code and sent to the corresponding post offices in the early morning. Sectional centers do not deliver mail and are not open to the public (although the building may include a post office that is open to the public), and most of their employees work the night shift. Items of mail picked up at post offices are sent to their own SCFs in the afternoon, where the mail is sorted overnight. In the case of large cities, the last two digits as assigned generally coincided with the older postal zone number.

For example:

Mr. John Smith
3256 Epiphenomenal Avenue
Minneapolis, MN55416

In 1967, these became mandatory for second- and third-class bulk mailers, and the system was soon adopted generally. The United States Post Office used a cartoon character, which it called Mr. ZIP, to promote the use of the ZIP Code. The name "Mr. ZIP" was coined by D. Jamison Cain. Mr. ZIP was often depicted with a legend such as "USE ZIP CODE" in the selvage of panes of postage stamps or on the covers of booklet panes of stamps. Mr. ZIP was featured prominently alongside musical group "The Swingin' Six" in a variety show that the post office used to explain the importance of using ZIP codes.

In 1971, Elmira (NY) Star-Gazette reporter Dick Baumbach found out the White House was not using a ZIP Code on its envelopes.  Herb Klein, special assistant to President Nixon, responded by saying the next printing of envelopes would include the ZIP Code.

ZIP+4
In 1983, the U.S. Postal Service introduced an expanded ZIP Code system that it called ZIP+4, often called "plus-four codes", "add-on codes", or "add-ons". A ZIP+4 Code uses the basic five-digit code plus four additional digits to identify a geographic segment within the five-digit delivery area, such as a city block, a group of apartments, an individual high-volume receiver of mail, a post office box, or any other unit that could use an extra identifier to aid in efficient mail sorting and delivery. However, the new format was not adopted universally by the public; it eventually became obsolete with modern technology. In general, mail is read by a multiline optical character reader (MLOCR) that almost instantly determines the correct ZIP+4 Code from the address—along with the even more specific delivery point—and sprays an Intelligent Mail barcode (IMb) on the face of the mail piece that corresponds to 11 digits—nine for the ZIP+4 Code and two for the delivery point.

For post office boxes, the general (but not invariable) rule is that each box has its own ZIP+4 code. The add-on code is often one of the following: the last four digits of the box number (e.g. PO Box 107050, Albany, NY 12201-7050), zero plus the last three digits of the box number (e.g., PO Box 17727, Eagle River, AK 99577-0727), or, if the box number consists of fewer than four digits, enough zeros are attached to the front of the box number to produce a four-digit number (e.g., PO Box 77, Juneau, AK 99750-0077). However, there is no uniform rule, so the ZIP+4 Code must be looked up individually for each box (e.g. using the USPS's official ZIP Code Lookup tool, and being sure to enter just city and state, not the 5-digit ZIP).

Postal bar code

The ZIP Code is often translated into an Intelligent Mail barcode that is printed on the mailpiece to make it easier for automated machines to sort. A barcode can be printed by the sender (some word-processing programs such as WordPerfect include the feature), but this is not recommended, as the address-to-ZIP lookup tables can be significantly out of date.

Customers who send bulk mail can get a discount on postage if they have printed the barcode themselves and have presorted the mail. This requires more than just a simple font; mailing lists must be standardized with up-to-date Coding Accuracy Support System (CASS)-certified software that adds and verifies a full, correct ZIP+4 Code and an additional two digits representing the exact delivery point. Furthermore, mail must be sorted in a specific manner to an 11-digit code with at least 150 mailpieces for each qualifying ZIP Code and must be accompanied by documentation confirming this. These steps are usually done with PAVE-certified software that also prints the barcoded address labels and the barcoded sack or tray tags.

The assignment of delivery point digits (the 10th and 11th digits) is intended to ensure that every single mailable point in the country has its own 12-digit number. The delivery-point digits are calculated based on the primary or secondary number of the address. The USPS publishes the rules for calculating the delivery point in a document called the CASS Technical Guide.

Structure and allocation

Scope and international mail
ZIP Codes designate delivery points within the United States (and its territories). There are generally no ZIP Codes for deliveries to other countries, except for the independent countries of the Federated States of Micronesia, the Republic of the Marshall Islands, and the Republic of Palau, each of which is integrated into the U.S. postal system under a Compact of Free Association. Another exception is ZIP Codes used for overseas stations of USA armed forces.

Mail to U.S. diplomatic missions overseas is addressed as if it were addressed to a street address in Washington, D.C. The four-digit diplomatic pouch number is used as a building number, while the city in which the embassy or consulate is located is combined with the word "Place" to form a street name. Each mission uses a ZIP+4 Code consisting of 20521 and the diplomatic pouch number.

For example, the mailing address of U.S. Embassy in New Delhi, India as per India's 6-digit Postal Index Number (PIN) code system is:

Embassy of the United States of America
Shantipath, Chanakyapuri,
New Delhi,
National Capital Territory of Delhi, 110021

Whereas the mailing address of the U.S. Embassy in New Delhi, India as per US's ZIP code system is:

Embassy of the United States of America
9000 New Delhi Place
Washington, DC20521-9000

However, individuals posted at diplomatic missions overseas are now assigned a Diplomatic Post Office address and unique box number. The ZIP Code identifies the diplomatic mission destination and is different from the diplomatic pouch number in the example above. While delivered through the pouch system, mail to such addresses are not considered "Diplomatic Pouch" materials, and as such must adhere to the mailing regulations of the host country. An example address is:

JOHN ADAMS
UNIT 8400 BOX 0000
DPO AE09498-0048

By type and use
There are four types of ZIP Codes:
 Unique: assigned to a single high-volume address
 Post office box-only: used only for PO boxes at a given facility, not for any other type of delivery
 Military: used to route mail for the U.S. military
 Standard: all other ZIP Codes.

Unique ZIP Codes are used for governmental agencies, universities, businesses, or buildings receiving sufficiently high volumes of mail to justify the assignment to them of exclusive ZIP Codes. Government examples include 20505 for the Central Intelligence Agency in Washington, D.C., and 81009 for the Federal Citizen Information Center of the U.S. General Services Administration (GSA) in Pueblo, Colorado. An example of a university-specific ZIP Code is 21252, which serves Towson University. An example of a private address unique ZIP Code is that assigned to the headquarters of Walmart (72716). They may also be assigned to a single program, such as the Postal Service's Operation Santa Claus program, under which children are invited to write to Santa Claus at "North Pole 88888".

An example of a PO box-only ZIP Code is 22313, used for boxes at the main post office in Alexandria, Virginia, including those used by the United States Patent and Trademark Office. In the area surrounding that post office, home and business mail delivery addresses use ZIP Code 22314, a standard ZIP Code.

By geography

Primary state prefixes
ZIP Codes are numbered with the first digit representing a certain group of U.S. states, the second and third digits together representing a region in that group (or perhaps a large city) and the fourth and fifth digits representing a group of delivery addresses within that region. The main town in a region (if applicable) often gets the first ZIP Codes for that region; afterward, the numerical order often follows the alphabetical order. Because ZIP Codes are intended for efficient postal delivery, there are unusual cases where a ZIP Code crosses state boundaries, such as a military facility spanning multiple states or remote areas of one state most easily serviced from a bordering state. For example, ZIP Code 42223 serves Fort Campbell, which spans Christian County, Kentucky, and Montgomery County, Tennessee, and ZIP Code 97635 includes portions of Lake County, Oregon, and Modoc County, California.

In general, the first three digits designate a sectional center facility, the mail sorting and distribution center for an area. A sectional center facility may have more than one three-digit code assigned to it. For example, the Northern Virginia sectional center facility in Merrifield is assigned codes 220, 221, 222, and 223. In some cases, a sectional center facility may serve an area in an adjacent state, usually due to the lack of a proper location for a center in that region. For example, 739 in Oklahoma is assigned to Amarillo, Texas; 297 in South Carolina is assigned to Charlotte, North Carolina; 865 in Arizona is assigned to Albuquerque, New Mexico; and 961 in California to Reno, Nevada.

Many of the lowest ZIP Codes, which begin with '0', are in the New England region. Also in the '0' region are New Jersey (non-contiguous with the remainder of the '0' area), Puerto Rico, the U.S. Virgin Islands, and APO/FPO military addresses for personnel stationed in Europe, Africa, Southwest Asia, and onboard vessels based in the waters adjoining those lands. The lowest ZIP Code is in Holtsville, New York (00501, a ZIP Code exclusively for the U.S. Internal Revenue Service center there). Other low ZIP Codes are 00601 for Adjuntas, Puerto Rico; 01001 for Agawam, Massachusetts, and the ZIP Codes 01002 and 01003 for Amherst, Massachusetts; 01002 is used for mail in town, while 01003 is reserved for the University of Massachusetts Amherst. Until 2001, there were six ZIP Codes lower than 00501 that were numbered from 00210 to 00215 (located in Portsmouth, New Hampshire) and were used by the Diversity Immigrant Visa program to receive applications from non-U.S. citizens.

The numbers increase southward along the East Coast, such as 02115 (Boston), 10001 (New York City), 19103 (Philadelphia), 21201 (Baltimore), 20008 (Washington, D.C.), 30303 (Atlanta), and 33130 (Miami) (these are only examples, as each of these cities contains several ZIP Codes in the same range). From there, the numbers increase heading westward and northward east of the Mississippi River, southward west of the Mississippi River, and northward on the West Coast. For example, 40202 is in Louisville, 50309 in Des Moines, 60601 in Chicago, 63101 in St. Louis, 77036 in Houston, 80202 in Denver, 94111 in San Francisco, 98101 in Seattle, and 99950 in Ketchikan, Alaska (the highest ZIP Code).

The first digit of the ZIP Code is allocated as follows:
 0 = Connecticut (CT), Massachusetts (MA), Maine (ME), New Hampshire (NH), New Jersey (NJ), New York (NY, Fishers Island only), Puerto Rico (PR), Rhode Island (RI), Vermont (VT), Virgin Islands (VI), Army Post Office Europe, Central Asia, and the Middle East (APO AE); Fleet Post Office Europe and the Middle East (FPO AE)
 1 = Delaware (DE), New York (NY), Pennsylvania (PA)
 2 = District of Columbia (DC), Maryland (MD), North Carolina (NC), South Carolina (SC), Virginia (VA), West Virginia (WV)
 3 = Alabama (AL), Florida (FL), Georgia (GA), Mississippi (MS), Tennessee (TN), Army Post Office Americas (APO AA), Fleet Post Office Americas (FPO AA)
 4 = Indiana (IN), Kentucky (KY), Michigan (MI), Ohio (OH)
 5 = Iowa (IA), Minnesota (MN), Montana (MT), North Dakota (ND), South Dakota (SD), Wisconsin (WI)
  6 = Illinois (IL), Kansas (KS), Missouri (MO), Nebraska (NE)
 7 = Arkansas (AR), Louisiana (LA), Oklahoma (OK), Texas (TX)
 8 = Arizona (AZ), Colorado (CO), Idaho (ID), New Mexico (NM), Nevada (NV), Utah (UT), Wyoming (WY)
  9 = Alaska (AK), American Samoa (AS), California (CA), Guam (GU), Hawaii (HI), Marshall Islands (MH), Federated States of Micronesia (FM), Northern Mariana Islands (MP), Oregon (OR), Palau (PW), Washington (WA), Army Post Office Pacific (APO AP), Fleet Post Office Pacific (FPO AP)

Secondary regional prefixes (123xx) and local ZIP Codes (12345)

The second and third digits represent the sectional center facility (SCF) (e.g. 477xx = Vanderburgh County, Indiana), and the fourth and fifth digits represent the area of the city (if in a metropolitan area), or a village/town (outside metro areas), e.g. 47722 (4=Indiana, 77=Vanderburgh County, 22=University of Evansville area). When a sectional center facility's area crosses state lines, that facility is assigned separate three-digit prefixes for the states that it serves.

In some urban areas, like 462 for Marion County, Indiana, the three-digit prefix will often exist in one county, while, in rural and most suburban areas, the prefix will exist in multiple counties; for example, the neighboring 476 prefix is found in part or entirely in six counties: Gibson, Pike, Posey, Spencer, Vanderburgh, and Warrick. In some cases, an urban county may have more than one prefix. This is the case with Allen (467, 468), Lake (464, 463), St. Joseph (465, 466), and Vanderburgh (476, 477) counties. Cities like Chicago, Houston, Los Angeles, and New York City have multiple prefixes within their city limits. In some cases, these may be served from the same SCF, such as in San Diego County, California, where the three-digit prefixes 919 and 920 are used for suburban and rural communities, and 921 for the city of San Diego itself, although all three are processed through the same SCF facility.

Despite the geographic derivation of most ZIP Codes, the codes themselves do not represent geographic regions; in general, they correspond to address groups or delivery routes. As a consequence, ZIP Code "areas" can overlap, be subsets of each other, or be artificial constructs with no geographic area (such as 095 for mail to the Navy, which is not geographically fixed). In similar fashion, in areas without regular postal routes (rural route areas) or no mail delivery (undeveloped areas), ZIP Codes are not assigned or are based on sparse delivery routes, and hence the boundary between ZIP Code areas is undefined. For example, some residents in or near Haubstadt, Indiana, which has the ZIP Code 47639, have mailing addresses with 47648, the ZIP Code for neighboring Fort Branch, Indiana, while others living in or near Fort Branch have addresses with 47639. Many rural counties have similar logistical inconsistencies caused by the aforementioned sparse delivery routes, often known as Rural Routes or by some other similar designation.

Almost all U.S. government agencies in and around the capital are assigned ZIP Codes starting with 20200 to 20599, which are Washington, D.C., ZIP Codes, even if they are not located in Washington itself. While the White House itself is located in ZIP Code 20006, it has the ZIP Code 20500. The Nuclear Regulatory Commission is located in Rockville, Maryland, at ZIP Code 20852, but has been assigned by the Postal Service the address "Washington, DC 20555".

In similar manner, the ZIP Code for the Metropolitan Washington Airports Authority, a federally chartered independent authority, is 20001–6000, even though the physical address of the Authority's office, "1 Aviation Circle", is in Arlington, Virginia.

One current exception to this rule is the United States Patent and Trademark Office (USPTO). When the USPTO was located in the Crystal City neighborhood in Arlington, Virginia, it was assigned by the Postal Service the address "Washington, DC 20231" despite being physically located in ZIP Code 22202. However, the USPTO now uses ZIP Codes assigned to its current locations in Alexandria, Virginia. The patents side of the USPTO uses a PO box assigned the ZIP+4 code of 22313-1450 for all postal communications. The trademarks side of the USPTO uses the same ZIP+4 code for most of its mail, but the office of the Commissioner for Trademarks has its own PO box with the ZIP+4 code of 22313–1451, and some offices within that part of the USPTO use the 22314 ZIP Code.

In rare circumstances, a locality is assigned a ZIP Code that does not match the rest of the state. In even rarer cases a ZIP Code may cross state lines. Usually, this occurs when the locality is so isolated that it is most conveniently served from a sectional center in another state. Examples:
 Fishers Island, New York, bears the ZIP Code 06390 and is served from Connecticut because the only ferry service is to Connecticut – all other New York ZIP Codes (excepting those at Holtsville for the IRS) begin with "1".
 Returned government parcels from Washington, D.C. are sent to ZIP Codes beginning with "569" so that returned parcels are security checked at a remote facility (this was put into place after the 2001 anthrax attacks). 
 Some Arkansas roads north of Bull Shoals Lake can best be accessed by the Protem, Missouri, delivery unit (ZIP Code 65733), as they are accessible by road only through Missouri.
El Paso, Texas, in addition to 798xx and 799xx (Texas has the 75xxx-79xxx ZIP codes), also uses ZIP code 885xx (which is right after the 870xx-884xx used in New Mexico).
 A portion of southern New Mexico uses the ZIP Code 79837, which is Dell City, Texas.
 Fort Campbell (ZIP Code 42223), is primarily in Tennessee, but the main entrance is in Kentucky.
 The Kentucky Bend geographical anomaly in far western Kentucky, where a small portion of land is separated from the rest of the state by a bend in the Mississippi River, shares ZIP Code 38079 with Tiptonville, Tennessee.

Preferred place names: ZIP Codes and previous zoning lines

A ZIP Code's address and the city name written on the same line do not necessarily mean that address is within the boundaries of that city. The Postal Service designates one preferred place name for each ZIP Code. This may be an incorporated town or city, a subentity of a large city or an unincorporated census-designated place, or a small unincorporated community. Additional place names may be recognized as acceptable for a certain ZIP Code. Still, others are deemed not acceptable, and if used may result in a delay in mail delivery.

Preferred place names are generally the city or town in which the address is located. However, for many cities that have incorporated since ZIP Codes were introduced, the city name is not the preferred place name. Many databases automatically assign the preferred place name for a ZIP Code, without regard to any acceptable place names. For example, Centennial, Colorado is divided among seven ZIP Codes assigned to Aurora, Englewood, or Littleton as its preferred place names; none of these seven ZIP Codes carries "Centennial" as a preferred name, and in the ZIP Code directory, Centennial addresses are listed under those three cities. Since it is acceptable to write "Centennial" in conjunction with any of the seven ZIP Codes, one can write "Centennial" in an address in Aurora, Englewood, or Littleton, as long as it is in one of the shared ZIP Codes.

Acceptable place names are usually added to a ZIP Code in cases where the ZIP Code boundaries divide them between two or more cities, as in the case of Centennial. However, in many cases, only the preferred name can be used, even when many addresses in the ZIP Code are in another city. People sometimes must use the name of a post office rather than their own city.

One extreme example is ZIP Code 85254; it was assigned the place name Scottsdale, Arizona, because it is served by the Scottsdale post office, but 85% of its territory is inside the city limits of neighboring Phoenix. Another notorious example is an entire neighborhood in the City of Los Angeles known as Beverly Glen, which is served by Beverly Hills Post Office. Its residents prefer the more glamorous Beverly Hills address and 90210 ZIP Code, but this regularly causes problems with emergency response when dispatchers have to sort out whether a given home in 90210 is in Los Angeles or Beverly Hills.

Similarly, Missouri City, Texas, straddles Harris and Fort Bend counties. The portion within Harris County is within the ZIP Code 77071, which must use the city name of Houston instead of Missouri City. At the same time, a small portion of the city of Houston is in Fort Bend County in the ZIP Code 77489, and residents there must use the name Missouri City for their address even though they are in Houston.

This also occurs in some rural areas where portions of one town have their mail delivered to other post offices. For example, while most of the town of Goffstown, New Hampshire is in ZIP Code 03045, some sections of town are in the ZIP Code area for the neighboring city of Manchester with ZIP Code 03102. Only the preferred name of Manchester is allowed in ZIP Code 03102, so residents of parts of Goffstown must list their address as being in Manchester.

This phenomenon is repeated across the country. The previously mentioned Englewood, Colorado is an inner-ring suburb that was built out by the 1960s. Its post office served the area that is now the high-growth southern tier of the Denver metropolitan area, and ZIP Codes in this area were assigned Englewood as their preferred place name. A business community as large as downtown Denver has grown in this area, with headquarters for many internationally recognized corporations. These companies indicate Englewood as their location (the preferred postal place name), although they are located in other cities. As a result, there are really two Englewoods – the city, small and with a largely working-class residential population, and, a number of miles away, the postal Englewood, a vast suburban area of upscale subdivisions and office parks that have nothing to do with the city of Englewood yet share a split identity with it solely because of ZIP Codes. People who say they live or work in Englewood and identify closely with it may rarely enter the city. In Indiana, the ZIP Code for a town usually indicates the ZIP Code for its corresponding township, as nearly all of Indiana's small town post offices have rural routes.

Acceptable place names also come into play in areas where citizens identify more strongly with a particular urban center than their own municipality. For example, Allegheny County, Pennsylvania, has 130 distinct municipalities, yet many of the county's residents, and even some residents of adjacent counties, commonly use Pittsburgh, Pennsylvania as their postal address. On the opposite end of the spectrum, in some urban areas, neighborhood names may be acceptable even though they have no legal standing, such as La Jolla, California, which is the preferred place name for ZIP Code 92037, despite the fact that La Jolla is a district of San Diego, California and not a separate legal entity. This ZIP Code is also in the 919/920 sequence used by San Diego County's suburban and rural areas, not in the 921 sequence used in the remainder of the City of San Diego, even though La Jolla has always been part of San Diego.

Many ZIP Codes are for villages, census-designated places, portions of cities, or other entities that are not municipalities. For example, ZIP Code 03750 is for Etna, New Hampshire, but Etna is not a city or town; it is a village district in the town of Hanover, which itself is assigned the ZIP Code 03755. Another example is ZIP Code 08043, which corresponds to the census-designated place of Kirkwood, New Jersey, but serves the entirety of Voorhees Township. This is also the case in LaGrange, New York, a portion of which is served by the 12603 ZIP Code based in the neighboring town of Poughkeepsie. The rest of LaGrange is served by the LaGrangeville Post Office. LaGrangeville is itself not a town at all, but a section of LaGrange. Willow Grove, Pennsylvania, served by the 19090 ZIP Code, is a village that straddles the border of Upper Moreland Township and Abington Township, and that post office also serves a small portion of Upper Dublin Township. Furthermore, non-municipal place names may also share ZIP Codes with municipal place names. For example, West Windsor Township, New Jersey, is commonly referred to in most mailing databases as Princeton Junction, a census-designated place within West Windsor. Silver Spring, Maryland, (20815, 20901–20912) is neither a city nor a town, but simply the common name for an unincorporated area consisting of a large part of the lower southern portion of Montgomery County.

Postal designations for place names become de facto locations for their addresses, and as a result, it is difficult to convince residents and businesses that they are located in another city or town different from the preferred place name associated with their ZIP Codes. Because of issues of confusion and lack of identity, some cities, such as Signal Hill, California (an enclave located entirely inside the separate city of Long Beach), have successfully petitioned the Postal Service to change ZIP Code boundaries or create new ZIP Codes so their cities become the preferred place name for addresses within the ZIP Code.

Postal designation confusion may have financial implications for local governments because mail volume is one factor used by the U.S. Census Bureau to estimate population changes between decennial census enumerations. Sometimes local officials in a community that is not the preferred place name for a ZIP Code but is an acceptable place name will advise residents to always use the name of the community, because if the census estimate of that town's population is low they may receive fewer funds that are computed based on population. A typical example is Paddock Lake, Wisconsin, whose preferred place name is Salem. Paddock Lake is incorporated as a village within the town of Salem, even though there are more people in the village of Paddock Lake than there are in the unincorporated parts of the town of Salem. Further confusion is caused because Silver Lake, Wisconsin, which is also a village in the town of Salem and is of similar size and status to Paddock Lake, has its own ZIP Code and post office.

In another case, the U.S. Federal Communications Commission (FCC) denied a radio station, WNNX, a move from Anniston, Alabama into the Atlanta market, which asked for a change of its city of license to its intended new studio location in Sandy Springs, Georgia, largely because it was not a city (until municipal incorporation in late 2005), despite being the seventh-largest place in the state by population. The FCC uses community support rather than full-market support to tabulate applications, and cited the specific use of "Atlanta" in letters of support from local organizations, even though the USPS forced them to use Atlanta for 30328 until well after incorporation took effect; the station then chose to license to College Park instead and associated technical changes for the application to meet acceptability, with studios in Sandy Springs. Currently "Sandy Springs" is only acceptable, despite none of 30328 being in Atlanta, or anywhere else outside the Sandy Springs city limit. This even applies to the ZIP Code used only for PO boxes at the Sandy Springs main post office.

Because ZIP Codes and their associated place names can ignore county lines, problems may occur where street addresses are based on quadrant location within a county. For example, the area served by 30339 straddles the Cobb County–Fulton County line in Georgia. The Cobb County portion of this area includes Vinings in the southeast of that county; the Fulton County portion lies within the city limits of Atlanta. Every street address in Vinings is labeled SE, and has a house number on the Cobb County grid (according to the distance from the town square in the county seat of Marietta). However, because the USPS demands the use of Atlanta, Vinings addresses are written such that they appear to be in southeast Atlanta, instead of in the opposite (northwest metro Atlanta) side.

Division and reallocation of ZIP Codes
Like area codes, ZIP Codes are sometimes divided and changed, especially when a rural area becomes suburban. Typically, the new codes become effective once announced, and a grace period (e.g., one year) is provided in which the new and old codes are used concurrently so that postal patrons in the affected area can notify correspondents, order new stationery, etc.

In rapidly growing communities, it is sometimes necessary to open a new sectional center facility, which must then be allocated its own three-digit ZIP-code prefix or prefixes. Such allocation can be done in various ways. For example, when a new sectional center facility was opened at Dulles Airport in Virginia, the prefix 201 was allocated to that facility; therefore, for all post offices to be served by that sectional center facility the ZIP Code changed from an old code beginning with 220 or 221 to a new code or codes beginning with 201. However, when a new sectional center facility was opened to serve Montgomery County, Maryland, no new prefix was assigned. Instead, ZIP Codes in the 207 and 208 ranges, which had previously been assigned alphabetically, were reshuffled so that 207xx ZIP Codes in the county was changed to 208xx codes, while 208xx codes outside that county were changed to 207xx codes. Because Silver Spring (whose postal area includes Wheaton) has its own prefix, 209, there was no need to apply the reshuffling to Silver Spring; instead, all mail going to 209xx ZIP Codes was simply rerouted to the new sectional center facility.

On the other hand, depopulation may cause a post office to close and its associated ZIP Code to be deallocated. For example, Centralia, Pennsylvania's ZIP Code, 17927, was retired in 2002, and ZIP Codes for Onoville (14764), Quaker Bridge (14771) and Red House (14773) in New York were prevented from going into use in 1964 in preparation for the Kinzua Dam's completion.

Elkins Park, Pennsylvania, was originally issued the 19117 ZIP Code, although it lies in Montgomery County, Pennsylvania. Because of the 191 prefix, which is found only in Philadelphia apart from that lone exception, auto insurance companies charged higher city premiums to residents of that suburban location. For that reason, residents petitioned the USPS for a 190-prefix ZIP Code, which is common to the inner-ring Pennsylvania suburbs of that city, and, after several attempts that were initially disapproved by the USPS, Elkins Park was finally reassigned to the 19027 ZIP Code.

ZIP Codes also change when postal boundaries are realigned. For example, concurrent with the above-noted change in Montgomery County, Maryland, and under pressure from the then-mayor of Washington, D.C., Marion Barry, the USPS realigned the postal boundaries between Washington, D.C. and Maryland to match the boundary. Previously, many inner suburbs, such as Bethesda and Takoma Park, Oxon Hill, Temple Hills, Suitland, and Capitol Heights had been in the Washington, D.C., postal area. As a result of the change, ZIP Codes in Maryland beginning with 200 were changed to new ZIP Codes beginning with 207, 208, or 209, depending on their location, and ZIP Codes straddling the D.C.–Maryland line were split. For example, 20016 (Bethesda) became 20816, while the Maryland portion of 20012 (Takoma Park) became 20912.

Other uses

Delivery services 
Delivery services other than the USPS, such as FedEx, United Parcel Service, and DHL, require a ZIP Code for optimal internal routing of a package.

Statistics 
, there are 41,702 ZIP Codes in the United States. ZIP Codes are used not only for tracking of mail, but also in gathering geographical statistics in the United States. The U.S. Census Bureau calculates approximate boundaries of ZIP Codes areas, which it calls ZIP Code Tabulation Areas (ZCTAs). Statistical census data is then provided for these approximate areas. The geographic data provided for these areas includes the latitude and longitude of the center-point of the ZCTAs. There are approximately 32,000 ZCTAs. The reason that there is not one ZCTA for every ZIP Code is that PO Boxes are excluded, since only populated areas are included in the Census data. The Census Bureau provides many statistical data sets for ZIP Codes, but does not keep up-to-date datasets of all ZCTAs. Complete datasets providing a similar approximate geographic extent are commercially available. ZIP Codes are inherently discrete or point-based data, as they are assigned only at the point of delivery, not for the spaces in between the delivery points. The United States Census Bureau then interpolates this discrete data set to create polygons, or areal features representing the approximate extent of the ZIP Code to use for mapping and data presentation. ZCTAs are not to be confused with ZIP Codes, and they are not updated as frequently as ZIP Codes. However, for many research and planning purposes, they are very useful and can be used with ZIP Code data.

Marketing 
The data is often used in direct mail marketing campaigns in a process called ZIP-code marketing. Point-of-sale cashiers sometimes ask consumers for their home ZIP Codes. Besides providing purchasing-pattern data useful in determining the location of new business establishments, retailers can use directories to correlate this ZIP Code with the name on a credit card to obtain a consumer's full address and telephone number. ZIP-Coded data are also used in analyzing geographic factors in risk, an insurance and banking industry practice pejoratively known as redlining. This can cause problems, e.g., expensive insurance, for people living near a town with a high crime rate and sharing its ZIP Code, while they live in a relatively crime-free town. (See Elkins Park, Pennsylvania, above.)

California outlawed this practice in 2011.

Legislative districts 
ZIP Codes may not currently be used to identify existing legislative districts. Although the website of the United States House of Representatives has a "Find Your Representative" feature that looks up congressional districts based on ZIP Codes alone, it often returns multiple districts corresponding to a single ZIP Code. This is because different parts of one ZIP Code can be in different districts. One proposal to eliminate the possibility of extreme partisan gerrymandering calls on using ZIP Codes as the basic units for redistricting.

Internet 
A 1978 proposal for a nationwide system of community networks suggested using ZIP Codes for routing.

ZIP Code data is an integral part of dealer / store locator software on many websites, especially brick-and-click websites. This software processes a user-input ZIP Code and returns a list of store or business locations, usually in the order of increasing distance from the center of the input ZIP Code. As the ZIP Code system is confined to the U.S. Postal network, websites that require ZIP Codes cannot register customers outside the United States. Many sites will purchase postal code data of other countries or make allowances in cases where the ZIP Code is not recognized.

ZIP Codes are regularly used on the Internet to provide a location in situations where an exact address is not necessary (or desirable) but the user's municipality or general location is needed. Examples (in addition to the store locator example listed above) include weather forecasts, television listings, local news, and online dating (most general-purpose sites, by default, search within a specified radius of a given ZIP Code, based on other users' entered ZIP Codes).

Credit card security 

ZIP Codes are used in credit card authorization, specifically Address Verification System (AVS). When a merchant collects the entire address, the ZIP Code is an important part of AVS. In some cases, the ZIP Code is the only thing used for AVS, specifically where collecting a signature, or other information is infeasible, such as pay at the pump or vending machines.

See also

References

External links 

 The Untold Story of the ZIP Code (PDF) – United States Postal Service
 ZIP Code promo film (1971) – U.S. National Archives

 
1963 in the United States
1963 introductions
Philatelic terminology
United States